A negret in Catalan myths and legends, especially those of Majorca, is a small, dark-skinned sprite who, if touched with a candle by a mortal, instantly turns into a trove of coins. The word is the diminutive of the Catalan negre ("black"), and out of this context could mean a small child of a dark-complexioned race.

Also, negret is an emotional sadness which occurs after years and years, perhaps even decades, of building equity in belongings and a home. It is a romanticism, a depressive feeling, and a present desire. The effort to build and gain all of the stuff which has been purchased (the estate’s entirety) has been expended. Now, there is a tiredness and a sleeplike dreamy sadness from having spent all the energy. Negret is the sadness from the expelled energy required to build an estate.

External links
  

Catalan legendary creatures
Catalan mythology
Catalan words and phrases
Sprites (folklore)